Outstanding Florida Waters are rivers, lakes and other water features designated by the Florida Department of Environmental Protection (DEP) under authority of Section 403.061 (27), Florida Statutes as "worthy of special protection because of their natural attributes." Outstanding Florida Waters have special restrictions on any new activities that would lower water quality or otherwise degrade the body of water.

The Outstanding Florida Water designation has been applied to all bodies of water in national parks, national wildlife refuges, national seashores, national preserves, national marine sanctuaries and estuarine research reserves, state parks and recreation areas, state preserves and reserves, state ornamental gardens and botanical sites, environmentally endangered lands programs, conservation and recreation lands programs, Save Our Coast program acquisitions, state aquatic preserves, scenic and wild rivers (both national and state), and certain waters in national forests. The DEP has also designated these 'special' Outstanding Florida Waters:

Apalachicola River  	
Aucilla River 	
Blackwater River 	
Butler Chain of Lakes 	
Chassahowitzka River System 	
Chipola River 	
Choctawhatchee River 	
Clermont Chain of lakes 	
Crooked Lake 	
Crystal River 	
Econlockhatchee River System 	
Estero Bay tributaries 
Florida Keys	
Hillsborough River 	
Homosassa River System 	
Kingsley Lake and Black Creek (North Fork) 	
Lake Disston	
Lake Powell 	
Lemon Bay estuarine system 
Little Manatee River

Lochloosa Lake
Myakka River (lower part)
Ochlockonee River
Ocklawaha River
Orange Lake, River Styx, and Cross Creek
Perdido River
Rainbow River
St. Marks River
Santa Fe River system
Sarasota Bay estuarine system
Shoal River
Silver River
Spruce Creek
Suwannee River
Tomoka River
Wacissa River
Wakulla River
Weekiwachee riverine system
Wekiva River
Wiggins Pass estuarine system

See also
 List of rivers of Florida
 List of major springs in Florida

References
Outstanding Florida Waters Fact Sheet - URL retrieved September 24, 2006

External links
 FloridaRivers.org

 
 
Rivers